The 2004 FIA GT Monza 500 km was the first round the 2004 FIA GT Championship season.  It took place at the Autodromo Nazionale Monza, Italy, on March 28, 2004.

Official results
Class winners in bold.  Cars failing to complete 70% of winner's distance marked as Not Classified (NC).

Statistics
 Pole position – #2 BMS Scuderia Italia – 1:43.509
 Fastest lap – #5 Vitaphone Racing Team – 1:44.708
 Race winner average speed – 189.060 km/h

References

 
  
 

M
Monza 500